The 1919–20 Gold Cup was the 8th edition of the Gold Cup, a cup competition in Irish football.

The tournament was won by Distillery for the second time, defeating Glentoran 3–1 in the final at Windsor Park.

Results

Quarter-finals

|}

Replay

|}

Semi-finals

|}

Final

References

1919–20 in Irish association football